Bathyclarias is a genus of airbreathing catfish endemic to Lake Malawi in Africa. Several are components of local commercial fisheries.

Species 
There are currently contains eight recognized species:
 Bathyclarias atribranchus (Greenwood, 1961)
 Bathyclarias eurydon P. B. N. Jackson, 1959
 Bathyclarias filicibarbis P. B. N. Jackson, 1959
 Bathyclarias foveolatus (P. B. N. Jackson, 1955)
 Bathyclarias longibarbis (Worthington, 1933)
 Bathyclarias nyasensis (Worthington, 1933)
 Bathyclarias rotundifrons P. B. N. Jackson, 1959
 Bathyclarias worthingtoni P. B. N. Jackson, 1959

References 

 

Catfish genera
Freshwater fish genera
Taxonomy articles created by Polbot